Hydnellum multiceps is a rare species of tooth fungus in the family Bankeraceae. Found in Nova Scotia, Canada, it was described as new to science in 1961 by mycologist Kenneth A. Harrison. The fungus has fruitbodies of overlapping and fused caps. The upper cap surface is initially pale brown but darken in maturity. The greyish-brown to dark brown spines on the cap underside measure 2–5 mm long. The spores are roughly spherical with sharp processes, and dimensions of 3–4.5 by 3–4 µm.

References

External links

Fungi described in 1961
Fungi of North America
Inedible fungi
multiceps